Kalgoorlie railway station is the easternmost attended station in Western Australia, located at the eastern terminus of the Eastern Goldfields Railway. It serves the city of Kalgoorlie. Beyond Kalgoorlie, the line continues east as the Trans-Australian Railway.

Establishment

Construction of the railway station and yard was begun in the late 1890s, as part of the extension of the Eastern Goldfields Railway from Coolgardie in January 1897. The station was formally opened by the Governor of Western Australia, Lieutenant-Colonel Sir Gerard Smith KCMG, at a ceremony held on the station platform on 8 September 1896.

In the early stages of the development of railways in the Eastern Goldfields, it was the junction for the following railways:

Kalgoorlie to Boulder, opened 8 November 1897
Kalgoorlie to Kanowna, opened 6 December 1897
Kalgoorlie to Menzies, opened 24 March 1898

In 1917, Kalgoorlie became a break-of-gauge station when the Commonwealth Railways' standard gauge Trans-Australian Railway from Port Augusta opened. This ceased on 3 August 1968, when the Eastern Goldfields Railway was gauge converted.

Loop line 
Surveyed in 1899, the line went from Kalgoorlie station. Due to costs and passenger decline, in 1920, some of the stations listed below were reduced in status by ceasing to be booking stations: Hannan Street, Golden Gate, Brown Hill and Trafagar. In 1921, fares increased. In 1930, the passenger service was closed.

 Maritana Street Bridge
 Victoria Street
 Hanbury Street – the junction

Western side:
 Robert Street
 Coombe Street
 Halfway
 Kallaroo

Inner western side
 Hainault
 Fimiston
 Horseshoe

Boulder Loop
 Golden Gate – junction
 Dunlop Crossing
 Clancy Street
 Boulder railway station
 Forrest Street
 Ivanhoe Crossing
 Kamballie – junction

Eastern side
 Trafalgar
 Hillend
 Brown Hill
 Croesus
 Williamstown

Platform
The platform was the longest in Western Australia, 527 m, but was eclipsed by the new East Perth Terminal platform, built for the 1969-70 extension of standard gauge into Perth. At each end of the main platform are bay platforms; the three to the east (adjacent to the former water tank and signal box) were where Boulder loop line passenger services arrived, and the western one is where the current Prospector services terminate. The eastern bays were converted to standard gauge for Trans-Australia Railway, prior to the extension of the standard gauge line to Perth.

Location and commemorations
Due to it being the western terminus of the Trans-Australian Railway, the station has been the location of a number of commemorations and ceremonies from the opening of that railway in 1917 and since.

Services
Kalgoorlie is served by the Transwa Prospector rural train service and the Indian Pacific. It was also previously served by the Kalgoorlie Express, The Westland and Trans Australian.

The Prospector service runs to and from East Perth once or twice each day.

Indian Pacific
The Indian Pacific also stops here. It runs once a week each way between East Perth and Sydney Central.

See also

References

External links

City of Kalgoorlie–Boulder
Railway stations in Western Australia
Railway stations in Australia opened in 1896
State Register of Heritage Places in the City of Kalgoorlie-Boulder